Brazi is a commune in Prahova County, Muntenia, Romania. It is composed of six villages: Bătești, Brazii de Jos, Brazii de Sus (the commune centre), Negoiești, Popești, and Stejaru.

In 1948 it had a population of 1,530; by 2011, the population of Brazi had increased to 8,094.

Natives
 Alexandru Tudor-Miu

References

Brazi
Localities in Muntenia